The Echo Project was a three-day music festival held from October 12–14, 2007 in Fairburn, GA.  The event was founded by Nicolas Bouckaert and held on 350+ acres of Bouckaert Farm along the Chattahoochee River. The main attractions of the festival were the multiple stages of live music, many artist venues, community building, and environmental awareness. The main stages were the Echo Stage, Lunar Stage, Eclipse Stage, Solar Stage, and the 99x Pontiac Green Garage.

Highlights

The festival included many environment-friendly practices including recycling containers, the use of corn-based plastic drink cups, various uses of solar energy, the purchase of renewable energy to offset emissions generated from the use of electricity at the festival and other activities including work exchange programs and donating a portion of proceeds to Trees For The Future.

About 15,000 tickets were purchased for the event.

Lineup

Notable appearances at the festival included:
The Killers
Phil Lesh & Friends
The Flaming Lips
Thievery Corporation
Common
Moe.
The Album Leaf
The Roots
Spoon
Cypress Hill
Les Claypool
Michael Franti & Spearhead
Clap Your Hands Say Yeah
Umphrey's McGee
Disco Biscuits
Stephen Marley
Rabbit in the Moon
GZA featuring Slick Rick
The Bravery
Medeski Martin & Wood
MSTRKRFT
Cat Power & Dirty Delta Blues
Polyphonic Spree
The Avett Brothers
Butch Walker

References

External links
the-echoproject.com Official Website

Folk festivals in the United States
Rock festivals in the United States
Jam band festivals
Music festivals established in 2007